Inside is the fourth album by New England singer-songwriter Bill Morrissey, released in 1992 on Philo Records.

Critical reception

Alex Henderson described Inside as "not perfect but consistently enjoyable" and gave it a rating of three stars out of five. Stephen Holden wrote in 1992 that Inside was Morrissey's best-sounding record, and it is described as "probably his best effort" in the Encyclopedia of Popular Music.

Track listing
Inside (duet with Suzanne Vega)
Everybody Warned Me
Offwhite
Gambler's Blues
Long Gone
Man From Out of Town
Rite of Spring
Robert Johnson
Hang Me, Oh Hang Me
Chameleon Blues
Sister Jo
Casey, Illinois

Personnel
Bill Morrissey—vocals, guitar
Johnny Cunningham—violin
Tom McClung—piano
Ron Levy—organ
Doug Plavin—drums
John Jennings—lead guitar on "Robert Johnson"
Greg Brown—vocal harmony on "Hang Me, Oh Hang Me"

References

1992 albums
Philo Records (folk) albums